Chinese Taipei competed in the 2006 Asian Games in Doha, Qatar, in November and December 2006. The Chinese Taipei team sent 399 athletes to the games, making Chinese Taipei the fourth largest delegation after China, Japan, and South Korea.  Despite Taiwan's small size, Chinese Taipei is a second-rank Asian sports power, finishing tenth in gold medals and seventh in overall medals at the 2006 Asian Games, a slight drop from its performance in the 2002 Asian Games in Busan, South Korea.

Medals

Taiwan finishes tenth in the medal table and eighth in overall medals.

Archery

Men

Qualification Round

Team: Qualified as the second seed
Quarterfinals December 13: v.  Kazakhstan - Win 223-214
Semifinals December 13: v.  India - Win 220-210
Gold Medal Match December 13: v.  South Korea - Loss 211-216
Won Silver Medal

Chen Szu Yuan: Qualified as the 10th seed
Round of 32 December 12: v.  Tashi Peljor Win 102-91
Round of 16 December 12: v.  Rahmat Sulistyawan Loss 102-102 (shootoff 8-9)

Kuo Cheng Wei: Qualified as the fourth seed
Round of 32 December 12: v.  Chan Kam Shing Win 102-88
Round of 16 December 12: v.  Marvin Cordero Win 106-97
Quarterfinals December 12: v.  Cheng Chu Sian Win 114-108
Semifinals December 12: v.  Im Dong Hyun Loss 100-106
Bronze Medal Match December 12: v.  Rahmat Sulistyawan Win 109-100

Women's

Qualification Round

Team: qualified as the fourth seed
Round of 16 December 13: v.  Mongolia Win 202-166
Quarterfinals December 13: v.  Indonesia Win 207-187
Semifinals December 13: v.  South Korea Loss 196-211
Bronze Medal Match December 13: v.  DPR Korea Win 208-206

Wu Hui Ju: Qualified as the 12th seed
Round of 32 December 11:  Dorji Dema Win 103-95
Round of 16 December 11:  Zhang Juanjuan Loss 101-109

Yuan Shi Chi: Qualified as the seventh seed
Round of 32 December 11:  Urantungalag Bishindee Lost 103-107

Athletics

Men

Chang Chia Che
Marathon
Final December 10 - 2:23:50; 10th place

Chang Ming Huang
Shot Put
Final December 11–19.45 meters; Bronze Medal

Chao Chih Chien
Long Jump
Qualification December 8 - 7.39m; 9th place (failed to qualify for final)

Chen Chin Hsuan
400 Meters
First Round, Heat 3, December 8 - 47.92; 3rd place (did not advance)

Chen Fu Pin
800 Meters
Heats, Heat 1, December 9 - 1:54.66; 7th place (did not advance)
1500 Meters,
Heats, Heat 1, December 8 - 3:49.85; 7th place (advanced to final)
Final, December 10 - 3:52.72; 11th place

Chung Chen Kang
400 Meters
First Round, Heat 1, December 8 - 48.00; 5th place (did not advance)

Hsiao Szu Pin
Decathlon, December 10 and 11

Liu Yuan Kai
100 meters
Round 1 - Heat 3 December 8–10.68; 3rd place (advance to semifinals)
Semifinal - Heat 1 December 9–10.57; 6th place (did not advance)

Wu Wen Chien
3000m Steeplechase
Final December 8–9:12.31; 8th place

Yi Wei Chen
200 meters
Round 1 - Heat 1 December 9–21.71; 5th place (did not advance)

400 Meter (4x100 Meter) Relay
Liu Chih Hung, Liu Yuan Kai, Yi Wei Chen, Tsai Meng Lin
Heats - Heat 1 December 11–39.93; 3rd place (advance to final)
Final December 12–39.99; 4th place

1600 Meter (4x400 Meter) Relay
Chung Chen Kang, Chen Chin Hsuan, Yi Wei Chen, Chang Chi Sheng
Final December 12 - 3:12.03; 6th place

Women

Chuang Shu Chuan
100 Meters
Heats, Heat 3 December 8–11.95; 4th place (did not advance)

Lin Chia Ying
Shot Put,
Final December 9–16.70m; Bronze Medal

Lin Yin Chun
100 Meters
Heats, Heat 1 December 8–12.11; 4th place (did not advance)

400 Meter (4x100 Meter) Relay
Lin Yi Chun, Chuang Shu Chuan, Chen Ying Ru, Yu Sheue An
Final December 12 - 45.86; Bronze Medal

Badminton

Women's

Singles

 Pai Min Jie
Round of 32:  December 5 v.  Hwang Hye-youn - Loss (0-2) 8-21, 11-21
 Cheng Shao-chieh
Round of 32:  December 5 v.  Li Li - Loss (1-2) 11-21, 21-18, 15-21

Doubles

Chien Yu Chin &  Cheng Wen-Hsing
Round of 16 December 7 v.  Kumiko Ogura & Reiko Shiota - Loss 0-2; 17-21, 19-21
Chou Chia Chi & Ku Pei Ting
Round of 32 December 6 v.  Satoko Suetsuna & Miyuki Maeda -  Loss 0-2; 18-21, 12-21

Team

The Taiwanese women were drawn with Japan and Korea for opening round group play.

December 2 (09:00) v.  Japan - Lost 1-4
December 2 (17:00) v.  Korea - Lost 0-3

Mixed doubles

Tsai Chia-Hsin and Cheng Wen-Hsing
Round of 16: December 6 v. Lee Jae Jin & Lee Hyo-jung: Loss 0-2; 16-21, 21-23

Baseball

The Taiwanese competed with Japan, South Korea, Philippines, Thailand, and China in a round robin baseball competition.  There is no medal round, so medals were determined based upon round robin results.  The Taiwanese came from behind in the ninth inning to defeat the Japanese in the final round robin game to win the gold medal.

November 30 - v. South Korea Win 4-2
December 2 - v. Thailand Win 16-0 (5 innings)
December 4 - v. China Win 4-2
December 5 - v. Philippines Win 15-0
December 7 - v. Japan Win 8-7

Table

Basketball

The Taiwanese sent both a men's and women's team to the 2006 Asian Games.

Men

The men automatically advance to the second round and will play in group F with China, Lebanon, Japan.  Uzbekistan and Kazakhstan qualified in from round one.

December 2  v. Japan - Loss 75-85
December 4  v. Kazakhstan - Win 81-79
December 6  v. China - Loss 65-101
December 8  v. Lebanon - Win 86-72
December 10  v. Uzbekistan - Win 106-69

Quarterfinal: December 12 v.  Qatar - Loss 96-103 (2 OT)
Classification: December 13 v.  Japan - Loss 67-78
Seventh Place: December 14 v.  Kazakhstan - Loss 74-100
Finished in Eighth Place

Women

The women will play their first round in group Y with South Korea, Thailand, and Kazakhstan.

December 5 -  v. South Korea - Win 80-73
December 7 -  v. Thailand - Win 102-73

Semifinal - December 11 v.  - Win  70-59
Gold Medal Game - December 14 v.  - Loss 59-90
Won Silver Medal

Bodybuilding

Chen Jung Sheng
60 Kilogram class
Prejudging December 8–30 points; 6th place (did not advance)

Hsu Chia Hao
90+ Kilogram class
Prejudging December 9–39 points; 8th place (did not advance)

Bowling

Men's

Women's

Boxing

Standing

Results
Venue: ASPIRE Hall 5

Legend:
PTS - Points

Cue sports

Men

Singles

Chang Chien Wen
Carom Three-Cushion
December 7 Round of 16 v.  Kim Kyung Roul - Loss 27-40

Huang Kun Chang
Eight-Ball
December 8 Round of 32 v.   Yukio Akagariyama - Win 9-3
December 8 Round of 16 v.  Ooi Fook Yuen - Win 9-7
December 8 Quarterfinal v.  Xu Meng - Win 9-7
December 9 Semifinal v.  Antonio Gabica - Loss 7-9
December 9 Bronze Medal Match v.  Leonardo Andam - Win 9-5

Ku Chih Wei
Snooker
December 6 Round of 32 v.  Atthasit Mahitthi - Loss 2-4

Lee Po Hsien
Snooker
December 6 Round of 32 v.  Do Hoang Quan - Loss 2-4

Wu Chia Ching
8-Ball
December 8 Round of 32 v.  Ham Won Sik - Win 9-7
December 8 Round of 16 v.  Ibrahim Amir - Loss 8-9
9-Ball
December 10 Round of 32 v.   Lee Chen Man - Win 11-4
December 10 Round of 16 v.  Sumit Talwar - Win 11-1
December 11 Quarterfinal v.  Jeoung Young Hwa - Loss 9-11

Yang Ching Shun
9-Ball
December 9 Round of 32 v.  Toh Lian Han - Win 11-9
December 10 Round of 16 v.  Luong Chi Dung - Win 11-5
December 11 Quarterfinal v.  Lee Gun Jae - Win 11-10
December 11 Semifinal v.  Jeffrey De Luna - Loss 7-11
December 11 Bronze Medal Match v.   Jeoung Young Hwa - Win 11-7

Yuan Yung Kuo
Carom Three-Cushion - Singles
December 7 Round of 16 v.  Thawat Sujaritthurakarn - Win 40-4
December 8 Quarterfinal v.  Ryuji Umeda - Loss 27-40

Snooker - Doubles

Ku Chih Wei & Lee Po Hsien
December 4 Round of 16 v. Mohsen Bukshaisha & Ahmed Saif - Loss 2-3

Snooker - Team

Ku Chih Wei & Lee Po Hsien
December 5 Round of 32 v.  Do Hoang Quan & Luong Chi Dung - Loss 1-3

Women

Lin Yuan Chun
8-ball singles
Round of 16 - December 8 v.  Miyuki Fuke - Win 7-6
Quarterfinal - December 8 v.  Cha You Ram - Win 7-6
Semifinal - December 9 v.  Pan Xiaoting - Win 7-5
Gold Medal Match - December 9 v.  Kim Ga Young - Win 7-6

Liu Shin Mei
8-ball singles
Round of 16 - December 8 v.  Esther Kwan Suet Yee - Win 7-2
Quarterfinal - December 8 v.  Kim Ga Young - Loss 4-7
9-ball singles
Round of 32 - December 9 v.  Nada Abd Alla - Win 7-0
Round of 16 - December 9 v.  Vidya Pillai - Win 7-6
Quarterfinal - December 10 v.  Suhana Dewi Sabtu - Win 7-2
Semifinal - December 11 v,  Pan Xiaoting - Win 7-3
Gold Medal Match - December 11 v.  Esther Kwan Suet Yee - Win 7-3

Tan Hsiang Lin
9-ball singles
Round of 32 - December 9 v.  Kim Ga Young - Win 7-4
Round of 16 - December 9 v.  Vuthiphan Kongkaket - Win 7-4
Quarterfinal - December 10 v.  Iris Ranola - Loss 6-7

Cycling

Road

Men

December 3 Individual Road Race
Chen Keng Hsien - 4:02.16, 18th place
Wu Po Hung - DNF

Women

December 4 Individual Road Race
I Fang Ju - 3:07.38, 12th place

December 5 Individual Time Trial
Huang Ho Hsun - 36:02.05, 8th place

Track

Men

Chen Keng Hsien
15 km Points Race - December 12 Heat 1 - 13 points; 7th place (advance to final)
40 km Points Race - December 13 Final - −35; Did not finish

Huang Hsin Hua
 4km Individual Pursuit
Qualifications December 9: 4:44.112; 10th place (did not advance)

Hung Chia Wei
 Sprint
Qualifications December 11: 11.059; 10th place (advance to Round of 16)
Round of 16 December 11 v.  Kazunari Watanabe - Loss
Quarterfinals B December 12 v.  Mohamed Husain - Win 12.012
Semifinals B December 13 v.  Jan Paul Morales - Loss
Finals B December 13 v.  Badr Ali Shambih - Win 11.798 (11th place)

Liu Chin Feng
 4km Individual Pursuit
Qualifications December 9: 4:53.006; 19th place (did not advance)

Liao Kuo Lung
 1km Time Trial
Final December 9: 1:06.358; 4th place
 Keirin
Round 1 December 14: Heat 1 - 2nd place (advance to semifinal)
Semifinal December 14: Heat 2 -  5th place (did not advance)
Final B December 14 - 2nd place (8th place overall)

Lin Kun Hung
 Sprint
Qualifications December 11: 10.957; 9th place (advance to Round of 16)
Round of 16 December 11 v.  Jeon Yeong Gyu - Loss
Quarterfinals B December 12 v.  Mohammad Farkad - Win (w/o)
Semifinals B December 13 v.  Badr Ali Shambih - Win 11.345
Finals B December 13 v.  Jan Paul Morales - Win 11.652 (9th place)
Keirin
Round 1 December 14: Heat 2 - DNF
Repechage December 14: Heat 2 - 3rd Place (advance to Semifinals)
Semifinals December 14: Heat 1; 6th place (did not advance)
Final B December 14 - 5th place (11th place overall)

Wu Po Hung
15 km Points Race - December 12 Heat 2 - 24 points; 6th place (advance to final)
40 km Points Race - December 13 Final - 7 points; 6th place

Team Sprint
Hung Chia Wei, Li Chung Ling, and Liao Kuo Lung
Qualifications December 10: 48.295; 6th place (did not advance)
Quarterfinals B December 12 v.  Mohamed Husain - Win 12.012

4 km Team Pursuit
Chen Chien Ting, Lee Wei Cheng, Lin Heng Hui, and Liu Chin Feng
Qualifications December 11:  4:24.940; 6th place (did not advance)

50 km Madison
Chen Keng Hsien & Wu Po Hung
Final December 14 -  9 points; 5th place

Women

Hsiao Mei Yu
 500m Time Trial
Final December 9: :36.190; Silver Medal
 Sprint
Qualification December 11:  :11.957; 3rd place (advance to Quarterfinals)
Quarterfinals December 12: v.  Sakie Tsukuda - Win 2 races to 1
Semifinals December 13: v.  Gong Jinjie - Loss 0-2
Bronze Medal Race December 13: v.  You Jin A - Loss 0-2

Huang Ho Hsun
 3km Individual Pursuit
Qualification December 10: 3:53.553; 6th place (did not advance)
 25km Points Race
Final December 14: 3 Points; 10th place

I Fang Ju
 3km Individual Pursuit
Qualification December 10: 3:54.680; 8th place (did not advance)
 25km Points Race
Final December 14: 6 Points; 8th place

Diving

Women
3 Meter Springboard Synchro
Lu En Tien & Lu Hsin
Final December 11 - 271.53 points; 4th place

Chen Lu
1 Meter Springboard
Final December 12 - 220.90 points; 7th place

Lu En Tien
3 Meter Springboard
Preliminary December 13 - 245.45 points; 7th place (Quality for final)
Final December 13 - 249.75 points; 8th place

Lu Hsin
3 Meter Springboard
Preliminary December 13 - 277.00 points; 5th place (Qualify for final)
Final December 13 - 254.95 points; 6th place

Equestrian

December 4 Team Dressage: 60.037, 5th place
Lee Yuan riding Laszlo 30, Lin Chun Shen riding Pani, Yeh Hsiu Hua riding Lear

December 10 and 11 Team Jumping:  32 faults, 7th place
 Jasmine Chen Shao Man riding Comodoro, Chen Yi Tsung riding Parodie 290, Joy Chen Shao Chiao riding Qualdandro, Wang Yi Hsiu riding Pik Papageno

Joy Chen Shao Chiao riding Qualdandro
Jumping
Qualifier December 10 - 8 faults - 20th place (tie)
Final December 12 - 5 faults - 4 faults (total 9 faults) (tied for fourth)

Jasmine Chen Shao Man riding Comodoro
Jumping
Qualifier December 11 - 4 faults - 6th place (tie) (advance to final)
Final December 12 - 4 faults - 4 faults (total 8 faults) (tied for second)
Jump-off December 12 - 8 faults (win)  Silver Medal

Chiang Han Ju riding Game Boy
Three-Day Eventing
Dressage December 6 - 53.80 penalty points - 9th place
Cross Country December 7 - Eliminated on course

Lee Yuan riding Laszlo 30
Dressage
Qualifier I December 4 - 58.883%; 22nd place (did not advance)

Lin Chun Shen riding Pani  
Dressage
Qualifier I December 4 - 60.722%; 16th place (advance to next round)
Qualifier II December 5 - 59.761%; 14th place (did not advance)
 
Yeh Hsiu Hua riding Lear
Dressage
Qualifier I December 14 - 60.556%; 18th place (advance to next round)
Qualifier II December 15 - 59.856; 12th place (advance to final)
Final December 15 - 60.420%; 12th place

Wang Yi Hsiu riding Pik Papageno
Jumping
Qualifier December 11–12 faults; 30th place (tied)

Fencing

Women

Chang Chia Ling
Epee
Pool 4
 
 v. Park Se Ra  - Lost 1-5
 v. Hiroko Narita  - Lost 1-5
 v. Ha Thi Sen  - Won 5-4
 v. Roza Bikkinina  - Won 5-0
 v. Ho Sin Mei  - Won 5-1
 Round of 16 v. Yeung Chui Ling  - Lost 9-15

Yu Mi Hsuan
Epee
Pool 1
 
 v. Li Na  - Lost 2-5
 v. Bjork Cheng Yuk Han  - Lost 2-5
 v. Siritida Choochokkul  - Lost 4-5
 v. Abeer Alselmi  - Won 5-1
 v. Ruchi Trikha  - Won 5-3
 v. Tatiana Ruban  - Lost 3-5
Round of 32 v. Roza Bikkinina  - Won 15-6
Round of 16 v. Li Na  - Lost 9-15

Team
Yu Mi Hsuan, Cheng Ya Wen, Chen Yin Hua
Round of 16 v.  - Win 45-20
Quarterfinals v.  - Loss 26-43

Football

Taiwan is not fielding a men's team at the Asian Games.

The women's football team will compete in group Y with North Korea, along with South Korea and Vietnam.

November 30 -  v. South Korea - Loss 0-2
December 4 -  v. DPR Korea - Loss 0-4
December 7 -  v. Vietnam - Win 3-1

Group Y

Golf

Men

Women

Gymnastics

Artistic Gymnastics (Men)

Team December 2 - 345.9  (Sixth place)

Pommel Horse December 5
Huang Che Kuei - 14.700 (fourth place)
Lin Hsiang Wei - 14.600 (sixth place)
Vault December 6
Huang Yi Hsueh - 1st Vault: 16.475; 2nd Vault: 0.000; TOTAL: 8.237

Rhymthic Gymnastics (Women)

Handball

There was no Taiwanese men's team at the event.

Taiwan's women's team has been drawn in Group B with Japan, South Korea, and Thailand.

December 7 -  v. Japan - Loss 20-31
December 9 -  v. South Korea - Loss 17-44
December 10 -  v. Thailand - Win 30-24
December 12 -  v. Uzbekistan - Win 26-25 (Fifth place match)

Hockey

There will be men's and women's teams fielded by the Taiwanese in the field hockey tournaments.

Men

The men were drawn into group A with Hong Kong, Japan, Malaysia, and Pakistan.

December 4, 2006 v. Hong Kong - Win 1-0
December 7, 2006 v.  Japan - Loss 0-4
December 9, 2006 v.  Pakistan - Loss 0-9
December 10, 2006 v. Malaysia - Loss 0-9
December 12, 2006 v. India - Loss 1-12 (classification round)
December 14, 2006 v. Bangladesh - Loss 1-5 (seventh place match)

Goal Scorers 
Huang Po-Hsiung  1
Fan Kuo-Heng  1
Tsai Ming-Heng  1

Women

All women's entrants played in a single round robin group.

December 2, 2006Korea - Lost 0-8
December 3, 2006 India - Lost 0-7
December 5, 2006 Japan - Lost 0-12
December 6, 2006 Hong Kong - Draw 0-0
December 8, 2006 Malaysia - Loss 0-2
December 9, 2006 China - Loss 0-7
December 13, 2006 Malaysia - Loss 0-5  (Fifth place match)

Judo

Men
60 Kilograms
Lin Chueh Chen - lost Bronze Medal Match

Women

Liu Shu Yun
70 Kilograms
Bronze Medalist

Wang Chin Fang
63 Kilograms
Lost Bronze Medal Match

Rowing

Men

Double Sculls
Wang Ming Hui and Chang Chien Hsiung
December 3 Heat 2 - 3:59.90, 2nd Place - advance to Semifinals
December 5 A/B Semifinal 1 - 3:31.55, 3rd Place - B Final
December 6 Final B - 3:22.77, 2nd Place (6th place overall)
Lightweight Double Sculls
Wen Kuang Cheng & Lin Yen Chen
December 3 Heat 4 - 4:34.07, 1st Place - advance to Semifinals
December 5 A/B Semifinal 2 - 3:40.43, 3rd Place - B Final
December 6 Final B - 3:28.31, 3rd Place (7th place overall)

Women

Single Sculls
Chiang Chieh Ju
December 3 Heat 2 - 5:04.20, 2nd Place - advance to Semifinals
December 5 A/B Semifinal 1 - 3:44.21, 3rd Place - Final B
Lightweight Double Sculls
Lu Ming Chen and Liu Yu Hsin
December 3 Heat 1 - 5:10.01, 3rd Place - repechage
December 4 Repechage - 4:31.84, 3rd Place - Final B
December 6 Final B - 4:04.49, 1st Place (5th place overall)
Four Oars Without Coxswain
Tsai Chia Ying, Hsieh Li Chun, Lin Pei Yin, Yu Chen Chun
December 3 Heat 2 - 4:49.12, 4th Place - repechage
December 4 Repechage - 4:02.49, 1st Place - advance to Semifinals
December 5 A/B Semifinal 2 - 3:47.91, 3rd Place - Final B
December 6 Final B - 3:47.83, 1st Place (5th place overall)

Rugby Sevens

Taiwan will field a team and have been drawn in Group C with Qatar and rivals Japan.

December 10
18:00 - v. Qatar
21:30 - v. Japan

December 2 v. Philippines - Win 3-0
December 2 v. Nepal
December 2 v. Japan

Sailing

Women's

Single Handed Dinghy Optimist

Shooting

Men

Women

Lin Yin Chun
Trap
December 2 - Final BRONZE MEDAL

Soft Tennis

Men
December 2 v. Philippines - Win 3-0
December 2 v. Nepal - Win 3-0
December 2 v. Japan - Win 2-1

December 2 Quarterfinals - Bye
December 3 Semifinals - v. Mongolia Win 2-0
December 3 Gold Medal Match - v. Japan Loss 1-2

Women
December 2 v. Mongolia - Win 3-0
December 2 v. Japan - Lost 1-2

December 2 Quarterfinals  v. Philippines - Win 2-0
December 3 Semifinals v. Korea - Loss 0-2
December 3 Bronze Medal Match v. China - Win 2-0

Mixed doubles

Fang Yen Ling & Yeh Chia Lin
1st Round - v. DE LEON JR. Wenifredo & ESCALA Divina Gracia  - Win 5-1
2nd Round - v. NAKAHORI Shigeo & UESHIMA Ayumi  - Loss 1-5
Classification - v. MUNGUNTSETSEG Anudari & RADNAABAZAR Bayartogtokh  - Win 5-1
Fifth Place Match - v. Chou Chiu Ping & Li Chia Hung  - Loss 1-5

Chou Chiu Ping & Li Chia Hung
1st Round - BYE
2nd Round - v. KIM Ji Eun & WE Hyu Hwan  - Loss 0-5
Classification - v. BANTAY Petrona & SILVOZA Orlando II  - Win 5-0
Fifth Place Match - v. FANG Yen Ling & YEH Chia Lin   - Win 5-1

Softball

The Taiwanese will join four other East Asian neighbors for the softball competition.

December 10, 2006 (08:30) v.  Korea
December 10, 2006 (13:30) v. Korea DPR
December 11, 2006 (11:00) v. Japan
December 12, 2006 (11:00) v. China

Swimming

Men

Chen Te Tung
200 m freestyle December 3
Heat - 1:57.96 (6th in heat)

Chiang Hsin Hung
50 m breaststroke December 3
Heat - :29.34 (2nd in heat)
Final -

Hsu Chi Chieh
100 m butterfly December 3
Heat - :55.29 (3rd in heat)
Final - :55.60 (8th in final)
200 m butterfly December 2
Heat - 2:02.00 (3rd in heat)
Final - 2:00.27 (5th in final)

Lin Yu An
400 m individual medley December 2
Heat - 4:42.11 (4th in heat)

Tang Sheng Chieh
200 m freestyle December 3
Heat - 1:55.32 (4th in heat)

Tsai Kuo Chuan
400 m individual medley December 2
Heat - 4:39.95 (3rd in heat)

Wang Wei Wen
50 m breaststroke December 3
Heat - :30.55 (6th in heat)

Women
He Hsu Jung
200m Backstroke December 3
Heat - 2:21.62 (4th in heat)

Lin Man Hsu
400m Individual Medley  December 3
Heat - 4:58.00 (4th in heat)
Final - 4:55.88 (6th in final)

Nieh Pin Chieh
200 Meter Freestyle
Heat - 2:05.71 (3rd in heat)
Final - 2:07.35 (8th in final)

Tsai I Chuan
100m Butterfly
Heat - 1:05.93 (5th in heat)

Yang Chin Kuei
200 Meter Freestyle
Heat - 2:03.22 (2nd in heat)
Final - 2:02.21 (5th in final)

400m Medley Relay - He Hsu Jung, Lin Man Hsu, Yang Chin Kuei, Nieh Pin Chieh 
Final - 4:22.14 (6th in final)

400m Freestyle Relay - Yang Chin Kuei, Nieh Pin Chieh, Tsai I Chuan, Lin Man Hsu 
Heat - 3:52.80 (2nd in heat)
Final -

Table Tennis

Team

The Taiwanese are fielding a men's team for the Table Tennis team event.  They have been drawn in Group D with Tajikistan (who later withdrew,) Singapore, and North Korea.

November 29 19:00 v. Singapore - Win 3-1
December 30 12:30 v. Korea DPR - Win 3-1

Quarterfinal:  November 30 v.  Vietnam - Win 3-0
Semifinal: December 2 v.  China - Loss 0-3

Doubles

Men

Chiang Peng Lung & Chuang Chih Yuan
Round of 32: December 4 v.  Hamad Bu Hijji & Anwar Saleh

Chang Yen Shu & Wu Chih Chi
Round of 32: December 4 v.  Pathik Nisheeth Mehta & Subhajit Saha

Women

Huang Yi Hua & Lu Yun Feng
Round of 32: December 4 v.  Nanthana Komwong & Anisara Muangsuk

Mixed

Chuang Chih Yuan & Huang Yi Hua
Round of 32: December 3 v.  Vong Hon Weng & Wong Sio Leng Win 3-0 (11-5, 11-5, 11-3)
Round of 16:

Chiang Peng Lung & Lu Yun Feng
Round of 32: December 3 v.  Ri Chol Guk & Kim Mi Yong Loss 1-3 (12-10, 9-11, 6-11, 4-11)

Singles

Men

Women

Taekwondo

Men

Chu Mu Yen
December 8 – 58 kg - bronze medalist

Liao Chia Hsing
December 8 – 78 kg bronze medalist

Women

Su Li Wen
December 7 – 63 kg gold medalist

Wu Yen Ni
December 8 – 51 kg silver medalist

Yang Shu Chun
December 7 – 47 kg silver medalist

Volleyball

Men

Round One

The Men's Volleyball Team has been drawn in Group C in the first round and will play Kuwait and Maldives in the first round.

November 27, 2006

November 28, 2006

Forfeit

Round Two

December 3

December 5

December 7

December 9

Women

The Taiwanese women have been drawn into group A for the first preliminary round with China, Vietnam, and South Korea.

November 30

December 3, 2006

December 6 

Quarterfinals - December 8

December 3, 2006

Semifinal - December 10
December 3, 2006

Bronze Medal match - December 12 v. Thailand

Weightlifting

Men

Wang Shin Yuan
56 Kilogram: Snatch - 118 kg; Clean & Jerk - 155 kg; TOTAL - 273 kg (5th in final)

Women

Fang Hsin Tzu
53 Kilogram: Snatch - 80 kg; Clean & Jerk - 116 kg; TOTAL - 186 kg (7th in final)

External links

Nations at the 2006 Asian Games
2006
Asian Games